The following is a list of MTV Asia Awards winners for Favorite Breakthrough Artist.

MTV Asia Awards